Telstar 12, previously known as Orion 2, is a Canadian communications satellite in the Telstar series which is operated by Telesat. It was originally built for Orion Network Systems, which merged with Loral Skynet shortly before the satellite was launched. It was subsequently transferred to Telesat when it merged with Loral Skynet in 2007.

Telstar 12 is a Ku band satellite with coverage of North America as far west as Cleveland, Ohio, the majority of South America and Europe. Telstar 12 also has the capability to provide intercontinental connectivity including trans-Atlantic to the Mid-East.  Eutelsat uses four transponders on the satellite for services between Europe and the Americas.

On 1Q 2016, Telstar 12 was replaced in its orbital position with Telstar 12 Vantage satellite.

See also

 Telstar
 Telesat

References

External links
International Media Switzerland  – official provider's site
Telesat's press release of T12V availability

Communications satellites in geostationary orbit
Telstar satellites
Spacecraft launched in 1999
1999 in spaceflight
1999 in Canada
Satellites using the SSL 1300 bus
Eutelsat satellites
Ariane commercial payloads